Alfred Werner (12 December 1866 – 15 November 1919) was a Swiss chemist who was a student at ETH Zurich and a professor at the University of Zurich. He won the Nobel Prize in Chemistry in 1913 for proposing the octahedral configuration of transition metal complexes. Werner developed the basis for modern coordination chemistry. He was the first inorganic chemist to win the Nobel prize, and the only one prior to 1973.

Biography
Werner was born in 1866 in Mulhouse, Alsace (which was then part of France, but which was annexed by Germany in 1871). He was raised as Roman Catholic. He was the fourth and last child of Jean-Adam Werner, a foundry worker, and his second wife, Salomé Jeanette Werner, who originated from a wealthy family. He went to Switzerland to study chemistry at the Swiss Federal Institute (Polytechnikum) in Zurich, but since this institute was not empowered to grant doctorates until 1909, Werner received a doctorate formally from the University of Zürich in 1890. After postdoctoral study in Paris, he returned to the Swiss Federal Institute to teach (1892). In 1893 he moved to the University of Zurich, where he became a professor in 1895. In 1894 he became a Swiss citizen.

In his last year, he was suffering from a general, progressive, degenerative arteriosclerosis, especially of the brain, aggravated by years of excessive drinking and overwork. He died in a psychiatric hospital in Zurich.

Werner died on 15 November 1919 of arteriosclerosis in Zürich at the age of 52.

Research

Coordination chemistry
In 1893, Werner was the first to propose correct structures for coordination compounds containing complex ions, in which a central transition metal atom is surrounded by neutral or anionic ligands.

For example, it was known that cobalt forms a "complex" hexamminecobalt(III) chloride, with formula CoCl3•6NH3, but the nature of the association indicated by the dot was mysterious. Werner proposed the structure [Co(NH3)6]Cl3, with the Co3+ ion surrounded by six NH3 at the vertices of an octahedron. The three Cl− are dissociated as free ions, which Werner confirmed by measuring the conductivity of the compound in aqueous solution, and also by chloride anion analysis using precipitation with silver nitrate. Later, magnetic susceptibility analysis was also used to confirm Werner's proposal for the chemical nature of CoCl3•6NH3.

For complexes with more than one type of ligand, Werner succeeded in explaining the number of isomers observed. For example, he explained the existence of two tetrammine isomers, "Co(NH3)4Cl3", one green and one purple. Werner proposed that these are two geometric isomers of formula [Co(NH3)4Cl2]Cl, with one Cl− ion dissociated as confirmed by conductivity measurements. The Co atom is surrounded by four NH3 and two Cl ligands at the vertices of an octahedron. The green isomer is "trans" with the two Cl ligands at opposite vertices, and the purple is "cis" with the two Cl at adjacent vertices.

Werner also prepared complexes with optical isomers, and in 1914 he reported the first synthetic chiral compound lacking carbon, known as hexol with formula [Co(Co(NH3)4(OH)2)3]Br6.

Nature of valence
Before Werner, chemists defined the valence of an element as the number of its bonds without distinguishing different types of bond. However, in complexes such as [Co(NH3)6]Cl3 for example, Werner considered that the Co-Cl bonds correspond to a "primary" valence of 3 at long distance, while the Co-NH3 bonds which correspond to a "secondary" or weaker valence of 6 at shorter distance. This secondary valence of 6 he referred to as the coordination number which he defined as the number of molecules (here of NH3) directly linked to the central metal atom. In other complexes he found coordination numbers of 4 or 8.

On these views, and other similar views, in 1904 Richard Abegg formulated what is now known as Abegg's rule which states that the difference between the maximum positive and negative valence of an element is frequently eight. This rule was used later in 1916 when Gilbert N. Lewis formulated the "octet rule" in his cubical atom theory.

In modern terminology Werner's primary valence corresponds to the oxidation state, and his secondary valence is called coordination number. The Co-Cl bonds (in the above example) are now classed as ionic, and each Co-N bond is a coordinate covalent bond between the Lewis acid Co3+ and the Lewis base NH3.

Works
 Lehrbuch der Stereochemie  . Fischer, Jena 1904 Digital edition by the University and State Library Düsseldorf

References

External links
  including the Nobel Lecture, 11 December 1913 On the Constitution and Configuration of Higher-Order Compounds
 The Nobel Prize in Chemistry 1913 - short article about his work on the linkage of atoms in molecules by which he has thrown new light on earlier investigations and opened up new fields of research especially in inorganic chemistry.

1866 births
1919 deaths
Scientists from Mulhouse
Inorganic chemists
Nobel laureates in Chemistry
Swiss Nobel laureates
ETH Zurich alumni
Academic staff of the University of Zurich
Swiss chemists
People involved with the periodic table